Bugabula is one of the five traditional principalities of the kingdom of Busoga in Uganda. It is located in the Kamuli District.

It was founded around 1730 and became a part of the British protectorate in Busoga in 1896. Its current ruler is Gabula William Nadiope IV .

References

Geography of Uganda